"It's Gonna Be" is the third single by American singer Norah Jones from her fourth album, The Fall. It was released exclusively in April 2010 for North America. It charted on the Billboard Triple A Chart and peak on airplay chart at #11.

Promotion
Jones performed the song on Later... with Jools Holland on November 5, 2009; as well as on The Ellen DeGeneres Show on April 23, 2010. Jones reappeared on The Ellen DeGeneres Show on June 25 and performed "It's Gonna Be" on the show for a second time. She also performed the song on The Tonight Show with Jay Leno on August 31, 2010.

Chart positions

References

Norah Jones songs
2010 singles
Songs written by Norah Jones
2009 songs
Blue Note Records singles
EMI Records singles
Song recordings produced by Jacquire King